Cab Number 13 is a 1948 Italian historical-crime-melodrama film directed by Mario Mattoli and starring Vera Carmi.

Cast
 Vera Carmi - Jeanne Herblet (segments "Delitto" & "Castigo")
 Ginette Leclerc - Claudia (segments "Delitto" & "Castigo")
 Sandro Ruffini - Pietro Thefar (segments "Delitto" & "Castigo")
 Marcel Herrand - Georges de la Tour Vaudieu (segments "Delitto" & "Castigo")
 Leonardo Cortese - Andrea (segments "Delitto" & "Castigo")
 Vira Silenti - Mathilde
 Flavia Grande - Olivia
 Pierre Larquey - Pierre Loriot, il cocchiere (segments "Delitto" & "Castigo")
 Raymond Bussières - Jean Jeudi (segments "Delitto" & "Castigo")
 Achille Millo - Louis
 Patrizia Muriel - Berthe Marois
 Achille Majeroni - Le professeur Charcot
 Paul Demange - Plume d'Oie
 Galeazzo Benti - Le commissaire Portier
 Henri Nassiet - Le duc de la Tour Vaudieu (segments "Delitto" & "Castigo")
 Roldano Lupi - L'amant de Claudia (segments "Delitto" & "Castigo")

See also
 Cab No. 13 (1926)

References

External links

1948 films
1948 crime films
French crime films
1940s Italian-language films
1940s French-language films
Italian black-and-white films
Italian crime films
Films directed by Mario Mattoli
Films based on French novels
Films scored by Renzo Rossellini
Melodrama films
1940s multilingual films
French multilingual films
1940s Italian films
1940s French films